Byron Ellis Browne (born December 27, 1942) is an American former professional baseball outfielder, who played in Major League Baseball (MLB) for the Chicago Cubs, Houston Astros, St. Louis Cardinals, and Philadelphia Phillies, between  and . He attended Central High School in St. Joseph, MO.

Browne was signed by the Pittsburgh Pirates as an amateur free agent, on September 9, 1962, then was drafted by the Cubs from the Pirates in the 1963 first-year draft.

In his first Major League Baseball at-bat, on September 9, 1965, Browne lined out in the second inning of Sandy Koufax's perfect game. In all, he played in parts of three seasons with the Cubs, hitting .236, with 16 home runs, in 134 games. Browne also led the league in strikeouts, in 1966, with 143.

Browne was traded by the Cubs to the Astros, on May 4, 1968, in return for Aaron Pointer but only played in 10 games with the Astros, totaling three hits in 19 at-bats.

The Cardinals purchased Browne from the Astros, on February 12, 1969, where he appeared in 22 games, while hitting .226, spending most of the season with the Triple-A Tulsa Oilers.

Browne was traded to the Phillies, along with Curt Flood, Tim McCarver, and Joe Hoerner, for Dick Allen, Cookie Rojas, and Jerry Johnson, on October 7, 1969. He played the rest of his MLB career for Philadelphia.

Browne's son (Byron Browne, Jr.) played 10 years in the Milwaukee Brewers farm system.

External links

Byron Browne at SABR (Baseball BioProject)
Byron Browne at Baseball Almanac
Byron Browne at Baseball Library
Byron Browne at Astros Daily

1942 births
Living people
African-American baseball players
Alijadores de Tampico players
American expatriate baseball players in Mexico
Arizona Instructional League Cubs players
Baseball players from Missouri
Batavia Pirates players
Chicago Cubs players
Dallas–Fort Worth Spurs players
Eugene Emeralds players
Florida Instructional League Tigers players
Houston Astros players
Major League Baseball outfielders
Mineros de Coahuila players
Oklahoma City 89ers players
Philadelphia Phillies players
Salt Lake City Bees players
Sportspeople from St. Joseph, Missouri
St. Louis Cardinals players
Tacoma Cubs players
Toledo Mud Hens players
Tulsa Oilers (baseball) players
Wenatchee Chiefs players
21st-century African-American people
20th-century African-American sportspeople